Joseph H. Zeno (June 14, 1919 – January 8, 1992) was an American football guard in the National Football League (NFL) for the Washington Redskins and the Boston Yanks.

Early life
Zeno was born in Brooklyn, New York and played high school football at  Waltham High School in Waltham, Massachusetts.  He then went on to play college football at the College of the Holy Cross.

Professional career
Zeno was drafted in the fifth round of the 1942 NFL Draft by the Washington Redskins, where he played until 1944.  During his tenure with the Redskins, he was named to the Pro Bowl in 1942 and won the 1942 NFL Championship Game.  Zeno then took time off to serve in the United States Army during World War II.  He then played for two more seasons with the Boston Yanks.

Coaching career
After retiring from the NFL, Zeno moved to California and became an assistant football coach at Arcadia High School for one season.  He then was head coach of the Santa Paula High School football team for 15 years, retiring in 1974.

Personal life
Many members of Zeno's family were also football players.  His sons, Larry and Joe, and his twin grandsons, Lance and Eric, are former UCLA Bruins football players.  Lance Zeno would eventually play in the NFL with the Cleveland Browns and Green Bay Packers.  Zeno died from complications of Parkinson's disease on January 8, 1992, at a hospital in Glendale, California.

References

External links
 

1919 births
1992 deaths
American football offensive guards
United States Army personnel of World War II
American people of Italian descent
Boston Yanks players
Sportspeople from Brooklyn
Players of American football from New York City
Washington Redskins players
Players of American football from New York (state)
Waltham High School alumni
Neurological disease deaths in California
Deaths from Parkinson's disease